Senator Whalen may refer to:

Charles W. Whalen Jr. (1920–2011), Ohio State Senate
Paul Whalen (born 1962), Hawaii State Senate

See also
Senator Whelan (disambiguation)